A conurbation is a region comprising a number of metropolises, cities, large towns, and other urban areas which through population growth and physical expansion, have merged to form one continuous urban or industrially developed area. In most cases, a conurbation is a polycentric urbanised area in which transportation has developed to link areas. They create a single urban labour market or travel to work area.

Patrick Geddes coined the term in his book Cities In Evolution (1915). He drew attention to the ability of the new technology at the time of electric power and motorised transport to allow cities to spread and agglomerate together, and gave as examples "Midlandton" in England, the Ruhr in Germany, Randstad in the Netherlands, and the Northeastern Seaboard in the United States.

The term as described is used in Britain whereas in the United States, each polycentric "metropolitan area" may have its own common designation such as San Francisco Bay Area or the Dallas–Fort Worth metroplex. Internationally the term "urban agglomeration" is often used to convey a similar meaning to "conurbation". A conurbation should be contrasted with a megalopolis. In a megalopolis the urban areas are close but not physically contiguous, and the merging of labour markets has not yet developed. A conurbation should also be contrasted with a megacity. A megacity is hierarchical with an indisputable dominant urban core, whereas a conurbation is polycentric and no single urban centre has the dominant role over all other centres.

Africa

Mauritius

The cities and towns of Port Louis, Beau Bassin-Rose Hill, Curepipe, Quatre Bornes, Vacoas-Phoenix and other urbanized villages form a large and central conurbation on the island of Mauritius. A large part of this conurbation is located in the district of Plaines Wilhems. The network of urban areas has a total population of 606,650 (49% of the island's population) as of 2011.

Morocco
Rabat-Salé-Kénitra

Nigeria
Lagos is a conurbation formed through the merged development of the initial Lagos city area with other cities and towns including Ikeja and Ojo. Also various suburban communities such as Agege, Alimosho, Ifako-Ijaiye, Kosofe, Mushin, Oshodi and Shomolu are included in the area.

South Africa
Johannesburg, Ekurhuleni (East Rand), and Tshwane (greater Pretoria) merged to form a region that has a population of 14.6 million.

Oceania

Australia

Albury-Wodonga
Albury and Wodonga are cross border cities which are geographically separated by the Murray River. Albury on the north of the river is part of New South Wales, while Wodonga on the south bank is in Victoria. In the early 1970s Albury-Wodonga was selected as the primary focus of the Whitlam Government's scheme to arrest the uncontrolled growth of Australia's large metropolitan areas (in particular Sydney and Melbourne) by encouraging decentralisation. The two cities combine to form an urban area with an estimated population of 93,603.

Canberra-Queanbeyan
A cross border built-up area comprising the nation's capital Canberra in the Australian Capital Territory and the city of Queanbeyan in New South Wales, which is considered by the Australian Bureau of Statistics to have a single labour market.

Newcastle, Sydney, Wollongong

This conurbation in New South Wales extends from Newcastle and surrounding satellite towns of the Hunter Valley through the Central Coast. It is broken up only by waterways and national parks, through to the greater Sydney metropolitan area and the Wollongong urban area. The total length from the top to the bottom of the conurbation is around 270km with a population of just over 6 million people. 

Transport is linked throughout the region by motorways, the M1, M2, M4, M5, M7, M8, M15 and M31. An extensive public transport network allows for commuting for work or services across and between multiple distinct but joined centres, with NSW TrainLink's intercity network serving Sydney, the Central Coast, Newcastle, the Hunter Valley, and the Illawarra.

Plans for making Wollongong, Sydney and Newcastle a single city have been around since the 1960s. A report titled The Committee for Sydney contains a chapter called The Sandstone Mega-Region, Uniting Newcastle, the Central Coast, Sydney, Wollongong (since all of the cities are in a geological region called the Sydney Basin, which is made up of Sydney sandstone). The report says that the link would benefit the “six cities” within the region, which are: Illawarra and Wollongong, the Western City (Greater Western Sydney), the Central City (Parramatta), the Eastern City (Sydney central business district, eastern suburbs, and Northern Sydney), the Central Coast (Gosford) and Newcastle (including Lake Macquarie).

Greater Perth
The Perth Metropolitan Region, City of Mandurah, and Pinjarra form a continuous urban area in Western Australia more than 130 km (80 miles) long, on a north–south axis. It is sometimes known as "Greater Perth" and has a population of more than 2.05 million (2015). Introduction of the Mandurah line in 2007 made it possible for commuters to travel the 70 km (43.5 mi) from Mandurah station to Perth station in 51 minutes.

South East Queensland
A built-up area 200 kilometres long which is centred on Brisbane, includes the local government areas (LGAs) of Gold Coast, Ipswich, Logan City, Moreton Bay, Redland City, Sunshine Coast, Noosa Shire, and Tweed Heads, New South Wales. This area is served by a single public transport network, Translink.

Broader definitions of South East Queensland are also used, including the separate built-up area of Toowoomba (140 kilometres; 87 miles west of Brisbane), which is not part of the Translink network. Expansive definitions of South East Queensland give it a population of more than 3.4 million people (2014), covers 22,420 square kilometres (8,660 sq mi), incorporates ten LGAs, and extends 240 kilometres (150 mi) from Noosa in the north to the Gold Coast (some sources include Tweed Heads).

New Zealand

In 2010 Auckland became a unitary authority encompassing seven former city and district councils including Auckland City, Manukau City, North Shore City and Waitakere City as well as a number of smaller towns, rural area and the islands of the Hauraki Gulf. Auckland Council is the largest council in Australasia and the region has a population of 1,529,300, being almost 33% of the total population of New Zealand. The entire urban area rather than the constituent administrative city was often referred to as “Auckland” by New Zealanders long before formal recognition.

The Wellington Metropolitan Area compromises the four cities of Wellington City, Porirua and the cities of Lower Hutt and Upper Hutt, together known as Hutt Valley. The Wellington Metropolitan Area is the second largest urban population in New Zealand with a population of 409,200.

North America

Canada

Golden Horseshoe (Ontario)
The "Golden Horseshoe" is a densely populated and industrialized region centred on the west end of Lake Ontario in Southern Ontario, Canada. The largest cities in the region are Toronto, Mississauga, Oakville, Burlington, St. Catharines, Niagara Falls, Ontario, Brampton, and Hamilton. If metropolitan areas (which are somewhat distinct from the core urban area of the Golden Horseshoe by about 30 to 50 km of less developed and semi-rural land) are included (similar to Combined Metropolitan Statistical Areas in the United States as defined by United States Office of Management and Budget), the total population is 8.8 million people. This is slightly over a quarter (25.6%) of the population of Canada, approximately 75% of Ontario's population, and one of the largest metropolitan areas in North America.

The larger area is named the Greater Golden Horseshoe and includes the metropolitan areas of Kitchener (including adjacent cities it is often referred to as Waterloo Region), Barrie, Guelph, Peterborough, and Brantford.  The Greater Golden Horseshoe is also part of the Windsor-Quebec Corridor and its southeastern boundary is across the Niagara River from the Buffalo–Niagara Falls metropolitan area in the United States.

Greater Montreal (Quebec)

Greater Montreal is Canada's second-largest conurbation. Statistics Canada defines the Census Metropolitan Area (CMA) as having  and a population of 3,824,221 as of 2011, which represents almost half of the population of the province of Quebec. Slightly smaller, there are 82 municipalities grouped under the Montreal Metropolitan Community to coordinate issues such as land planning, transportation, and economic development.

Lower Mainland (British Columbia)

British Columbia's Lower Mainland is the most populated area in Western Canada. It consists of many mid-sized contiguous urban areas, including Vancouver, North Vancouver (city and district municipality), West Vancouver, Burnaby, New Westminster, Richmond, Surrey, and Coquitlam, among others. The Lower Mainland population is around 2.5 million (as of 2011) and the area has one of the highest growth rates on the continent of up to 9.2 percent from the 2006 census.

National Capital Region (Ontario and Quebec)

The National Capital Region (NCR) is made up of the capital, Ottawa, and neighbouring Gatineau which is located across the Ottawa River. As Ottawa is in Ontario and Gatineau is in Quebec, it is a unique conurbation. Federal government buildings are located in both cities and many workers live in one city and work in the other. The National Capital Region consists of an area of 5,319 square kilometres that straddles the boundary between the provinces of Ontario and Quebec. The area of the National Capital Region is very similar to that of the Ottawa-Gatineau Census Metropolitan Area (CMA) although the National Capital Region contains a number of small neighbouring communities that are not contained within the CMA. When all the communities are included, the population of the area is about 1,500,000. Ottawa-Gatineau is the only CMA in the nation to fall within two provinces.

Mexico

Mexico City (CDMX)

The "CDMX" is the most densely populated center in North America. Greater Mexico City refers to the conurbation around Mexico City, officially called Valley of Mexico Metropolitan Area (Zona Metropolitana del Valle de México), constituted by Mexico City itself composed of 16 Municipalities—and 41 adjacent municipalities of the states of  Mexico and Hidalgo. However for normative purposes, Greater Mexico City most commonly refers to the Metropolitan Area of the Valley of Mexico (Zona Metropolitana del Valle de México) an agglomeration that incorporates 18 additional municipalities. As of 2019 an estimated 27,782,000 people lived in Greater Mexico City, making it the largest metropolitan area in North America. It is surrounded by thin strips of highlands which separate it from other adjacent metropolitan areas, of which the biggest are Puebla, Toluca, and Cuernavaca-Cuautla, and together with which it makes up the Mexico City megalopolis.

Guadalajara Metropolitan Area (Zona Metropolitana de Guadalajara) 
The Guadalajara conurbation in the state of Jalisco (colloquially known as the City of Guadalajara, as that is the state capital and most populous of the cities) comprises seven municipalities: Guadalajara, Zapopan, Tlaquepaque, Tonalá, El Salto, Zapotlanejo, and Tlajomulco de Zúñiga. Officially two other cities (Juanacatlán and Ixtlahuacán de los Membrillos) are also considered part of the Metropolitan Area, though they are not contiguous with the other seven.

United States

Puerto Rico

The Caribbean area has a conurbation in Puerto Rico consisting of San Juan, Bayamón, Guaynabo, Carolina, Canóvanas, Trujillo Alto, Toa Alta, Toa Baja, Cataño, and Caguas. This area is colloquially known as the "Área Metropolitana", and houses around 1.4 million inhabitants spread over an area of approximately 396.61 square kilometers (153.13 sq mi), making it the largest city in the Caribbean by area.

New York Tri-state area
One example of a conurbation is the expansive concept of the New York metropolitan area (the Tri-state region) centered on New York City, including 30 counties spread among New York State, New Jersey, Connecticut, and Pennsylvania, with an estimated population of 21,961,994 in 2007. Approximately one-fifteenth of all U.S. residents live in the Greater New York City area, the world's most brightly illuminated urban conurbation and largest urban landmass. This conurbation is the result of several central cities whose urban areas have merged.

Greater Boston Area

Holding a population of 7,427,336 as of 2005, the Combined Statistical Area including Greater Boston consists of Boston proper and a collection of distinct but intertwined cities including Providence, Rhode Island, Worcester, Massachusetts, and Manchester, New Hampshire. Most importantly, the cities that compose the Greater Boston CSA are interlinked by heavy public transportation infrastructure, maintain continuously urban interstices, and hold mutual commuting patterns.

San Francisco Bay Area
Another conurbation is the combination of the metropolitan areas of San Francisco, Oakland, and San Jose and several minor urban centers with a combined population of nearly 8 million people, known as the San Francisco Bay Area.

Greater Los Angeles Area

The Greater Los Angeles Area consists of the merging of several distinct central cities and counties, including Los Angeles, Orange County, Riverside, San Bernardino, and Ventura. This area is also often referred to simply as Southern California or colloquially as SoCal (a larger region which includes San Diego).  In 2016, Southern California had a population of 23,800,500, making it slightly larger than the New York Tri-State Area, and is projected to remain so due to a faster growth rate.  But because Southern California is not yet a recognized Combined Statistical Area by the United States Office of Management and Budget, the New York Tri-State Area officially remains the nation's largest as of now.

Greater Houston area
An example of a conurbation is seen in Greater Houston. Centered in Houston, the area is continuously urbanized from the coastal areas of Galveston extending through the northern side of the metro area, including The Woodlands, Conroe, and Spring, and going up to Huntsville. The suburbs of Fort Bend County, Texas extend through the cities of the Galveston Bay Area and beyond. It has a population of 7,197,883.

Baltimore–Washington Area

The traditionally separate metropolitan areas of Baltimore and Washington, D.C. have shared suburbs and a continuous urbanization between the two central cities (Baltimore–Washington metropolitan area).

San Diego–Tijuana
The largest conurbation between the United States and Mexico is San Diego–Tijuana. It includes the two countries' busiest border crossing and a shared economy.

Dallas–Fort Worth
Three large cities—Dallas, Fort Worth, and Arlington—make up this area. Each city is linked by bordering city limits or suburbs. The area is also known as the Dallas–Fort Worth “metroplex”, so called because it has more than one principal anchor city of nearly equal size or importance, and is included in the emerging megalopolis known as the Texas Triangle. According to Texas Monthly, the term is a portmanteau of the terms "metropolitan" and "complex" and was created by a local advertising agency, TracyLocke. The North Texas Commission trademarked the term "Dallas/Fort Worth Metroplex" in 1972 as a replacement for the previously ubiquitous term "North Texas". Urban areas with smaller secondary anchor cities (including Mexico City, New York City, Los Angeles, Houston, Chicago, and Phoenix) are not considered to be conurbations.

Detroit–Windsor
The major U.S. city of Detroit lies immediately across the Detroit River from Windsor, Ontario in Canada.  In many respects—economically, historically, culturally, socially, and geographically—Windsor is more a part of Metro Detroit than of Ontario. The two cities and their surrounding suburbs are commonly referred to collectively as the Detroit–Windsor area.  The Detroit-Windsor border is the largest commercial border crossing in North America and the busiest between the two countries.

South Florida

The entire tri-county area also known as the Miami-Fort Lauderdale-West Palm Beach metropolitan area is now continuously urbanized along a roughly  length of the Florida east coast as well as extending inland and continuing south of Miami as far as Florida City. Although this is generally all referred to as a single metropolitan area, not a conurbation, it is sometimes broken up into the Miami, Fort Lauderdale, and West Palm Beach metros.

Minneapolis–St. Paul

Minneapolis–Saint Paul is the most populous urban area in the state of Minnesota, and is composed of 182 cities and townships built around the Mississippi, Minnesota, and St. Croix rivers. The area is also nicknamed the Twin Cities for its two largest cities, Minneapolis, with the highest population and Saint Paul, the state capital.

Quad Cities 
The Quad Cities is a metropolitan area located along the border of Illinois and Iowa. Straddling the Mississippi River as it flows west, the area once known as the "Tri Cities" consists of a handful of larger cities and smaller municipalities that have grown together. The largest cities include Rock Island, Moline, and East Moline in Illinois as well as Davenport and Bettendorf in Iowa.

The Valley of the Sun

Phoenix is the capital and most populous city in Arizona. It is the center of The Valley of the Sun which is recognized by the United States Census Bureau as Chandler, Mesa, and Phoenix in the MSA. Other communities in the metropolitan area include Scottsdale, Glendale, Tempe, Gilbert, and Peoria.

The Front Range Urban Corridor
Denver is the capital and most populous city in Colorado, as well as the most populous municipality in the Front Range Urban Corridor. This conurbation encompasses 18 counties in Colorado and Wyoming and had an estimated population of 4,976,781 in 2018, an increase of 14.84% since the 2010 United States Census.

South America

Full article in Spanish Wikipedia: List of Conurbations in South America

Argentina

 Greater Buenos Aires (12.046.799) – Greater La Plata (694.253) – Zárate / Campana

Brazil
The entire Rio–São Paulo area is also sometimes considered a conurbation, and plans are in the works to connect the cities with a high-speed rail. However the government of Brazil does not consider this area a single unit for statistical purposes, and population data may not be reliable.

Colombia

Peru

Asia

China

There are 3 well-known conurbations in China.
 The Yangtze River Delta comprising Shanghai, Nanjing, Hangzhou and Ningbo, houses 150 million people and in 2016 it generated $2.76 trillion, 20 percent of China's national GDP. It is responsible for one-third of China's imports and exports.
 The Jingjinji, comprising Tianjin, Beijing, Tangshan and Qinhuangdao, houses an estimated 130 million people and is responsible for a GDP of $1.1 trillion.
 The Pearl River Delta including Guangzhou, Shenzhen, Dongguan, Hong Kong and Macau houses 60 million people and is responsible for a GDP of $1,5 trillion, 9% of China's national GDP.

India
The Mumbai Metropolitan Region (MMR) consists of Mumbai and its satellite towns. Developing over a period of about 20 years, it consists of seven municipal corporations and fifteen smaller municipal councils. The region has an area of 4,355 km2 and with a population of 20.5 million, and is among the top ten most populated urban agglomerations in the world. It is linked together through the Mumbai Suburban Railway system and a large network of roads.

The National Capital Region (NCR) is a name for the coordinated planning region which encompasses the entire National Capital Territory of Delhi as well as several surrounding districts in the neighbouring states of Uttar Pradesh, Haryana and Rajasthan. However, the conurbation of Delhi is actually limited to the NCT of Delhi and the neighbouring contiguous urban areas comprising Gurgaon, Faridabad, Noida, Greater Noida and Ghaziabad. The area is officially known as the Central National Capital Region (CNCR), a small part of overall NCR. The population of this conurbation was estimated 21.7 million in 2011. It is the world's third most populous urban agglomeration.

The Amaravati Metropolitan Region (AMR) of Andhra Pradesh is a conurbation of three cities, namely Vijayawada, Eluru and Guntur and 11 other towns which include Mangalagiri, Tadepalle, Tenali, Ponnuru, Chilakaluripeta, Narasaraopeta, Sattenapally, Nandigama, Jaggayyapeta, Nuzividu, Gudivada and Vuyyuru. The new capital city of the state, Amaravati, is being developed between the cities of Vijayawada and Guntur at the center of the conurbation. The region holds a total population of 58 lakhs.

The Jamshedpur Metropolitan Area has a plan of Greater Jamshedpur. This place contains the area and city of Adityapur, Maango and Jugsalai

Bangladesh

As of 2018 Dhaka was linked with Narayanganj and Gazipur city; there are no gaps between Dhaka and those two cities.

Indonesia
Greater Jakarta or Jabodetabek comprises the largest urban area in Indonesia and the second-largest in the world with a population of around 30 million. The center and national capital, Jakarta, has a population of 10.3 million within its borders.

The second-most populated city in Indonesia, Surabaya, also forms a conurbation known as Gerbangkertosusila with a metropolitan population of about 10 million compared to the city proper of 3 million. Conurbations are also present around Bandung and Medan.

Israel
 Gush Dan, Metropolitan Area of Tel Aviv, Central District (has about 45% of the country's total population)

Japan

The Taiheiyō Belt is the largest conurbation in Japan in every sense, extending from Ibaraki Prefecture to Fukuoka Prefecture, running almost 1,200 km, with the total population of 82.9 million. However, it is rarely referred to in Japan itself with each Prefecture maintaining separate identities. The Greater Tokyo Area, also called Shutoken (the National Capital Region), is a metropolitan area in the Kantō region, with the estimated population of 35,676,000 in 2007, often referred to as the most populous and economically largest metropolitan area in the world.

Jordan
More than 50% of Jordan’s population live in the conurbation of Amman-Russeifa-Zarqa.

Malaysia
The Klang Valley conurbation in the state of Selangor is composed of these areas:
 Kuala Lumpur, the capital of Malaysia;
 Petaling Jaya;
 Ampang Jaya;
 Pandan Indah;
 Subang Jaya;
 Shah Alam;
 Klang;
 Selayang;
 Gombak;
 Putrajaya;
 Cyberjaya;
 Sepang; and
 Kajang.
The second largest conurbation by population in Malaysia is Greater Penang. Centred in George Town which is the capital city of the State of Penang, the conurbation also includes these towns in Penang, and within the neighbouring states of Kedah and Perak.
Butterworth
 Bukit Mertajam
 Perai
Batu Kawan
 Nibong Tebal
 Sungai Petani, Kedah
 Kulim, Kedah
 Bandar Baharu, Kedah
 Parit Buntar, Perak
Bagan Serai, Perak

The third largest conurbation by population in Malaysia is Iskandar Malaysia. Centred in Johor Bahru which is the capital city of the state of Johor, the conurbation also includes these towns in Johor.
 Johor Bahru, the centre of Iskandar Malaysia
 Tebrau
 Pasir Gudang
 Ulu Tiram
 Kempas
 Tampoi
 Skudai
 Iskandar Puteri
 Senai
 Kulai
 Pekan Nenas

Pakistan

Karachi–Hyderabad, Sindh, is one of the largest metropolitan areas of the world, with a population exceeding 20 million (2017).
Rawalpindi–Islamabad, also known as the twin cities of Pakistan, were built about 8 miles apart and have now completely intertwined into each other due to massive population growth and the expansion of both cities.
 Lahore–Raiwind–Kala Shah Kaku, the second largest city in Pakistan with its adjoining towns of Kala Shah Kaku and Raiwind.

Palestine
The Gaza Strip conurbation has a population of 2.1 million.

Philippines

Metro Manila, also known as the National Capital Region, is a conurbation of the capital Manila, fifteen neighboring cities, and a small town to compose the largest urban center in the Philippines. Within the immediate periphery but not administratively part of the region, are cities and towns belonging to various provinces near the capital region. These include the cities of Antipolo, Bacoor, Meycauayan, San Jose del Monte and San Pedro; and the towns of Angono, Binangonan, Cainta, Cardona, Marilao, Obando, Rodriguez, San Mateo and Taytay.

Taiwan

There are 3 major conurbations in Taiwan.
 The Taipei-Taoyuan-Keelung Metropolitan Area (also known as Northern Taiwan Conurbation) is located in northern Taiwan, comprising Taipei, New Taipei, Keelung and Taoyuan, houses 9.3 million people. It is the most populous and the most densely populated metropolitan area in Taiwan, with one-third of Taiwanese people living and working there. The region is the epicenter of Taiwanese culture, economy, education and government. Designated as a global city, the region exerts a significant impact on commerce, finance, media, art, fashion, research, technology, education, and entertainment, both locally and internationally.
 The Taichung–Changhua-Nantou metropolitan area (also known as Central Taiwan Conurbation), located in central Taiwan and comprising Taichung, Changhua, and Nantou, houses an estimated 4.6 million people, about a fifth of the Taiwanese population.
 The Kaohsiung-Pingtung-Tainan metropolitan area (also known as Southern Taiwan Conurbation), including Kaohsiung, Tainan and Pingtung, is located in southern Taiwan and houses approximately 5.4 million people.

Turkey
Asian part of Istanbul forms a conurbation together with Gebze, Darıca, Çayırova, Dilovası districts of Kocaeli Province and with town of Yalova on south of the İzmit Bay. Each province has separate governments but they work in close coordination. Transport between Anatolian part of Istanbul and western end of Kocaeli is coordinated by both provinces and there are interprovincial urban buses between Kartal and İzmit and commuter rail service between Halkalı and Gebze via Bosphorus, dense ferry service between Yalova and İstanbul although each municipality has a clear boundary of service. Tri-province region makes 17,5 million, which is 20% of Turkey's population.

İzmir and Manisa forms a conurbation. Although there is a mountain between cities with D565 via Sabuncubeli Tunnel many people daily commutes for work, education and home. In addition, İZBAN commuter rail connects satellite towns with İzmir in north and south directions. Two cities metropolitan areas together makes up of a population of 3,3 million.

Thailand

Bangkok Metropolitan Region, Thailand, is an urban agglomeration of the Bangkok metropolis as well as the five adjacent provinces of Nakhon Pathom, Pathum Thani, Nonthaburi, Samut Prakan, and Samut Sakhon.

United Arab Emirates 
The United Arab Emirates, while comprising seven distinct entities called emirates, each with its own Emirs, contains a significant conurbation formed by the agglomeration of the urban areas of three cities belonging to three separate Emirates. The Dubai-Sharjah-Ajman metropolitan area contains the urban areas of Dubai to the south, Sharjah in the middle and Ajman toward the north eastern end of the conurbation. The total population is about 5.64 million people as of 2015 and as such, contributes to over 70% of the UAE population. Dubai is the major financial hub and Sharjah serves as an industrial, educational, cultural and major residential centre.

Vietnam

Ho Chi Minh City Metropolitan Region: comprising Ho Chi Minh City (itself comprising the inner districts, Nhà Bè, Bình Chánh, Hóc Môn, Củ Chi and Cần Giờ); Bình Dương (itself comprising Thủ Dầu Một, Bến Cát, Tân Uyên, Thuận An, Dĩ An); Đồng Nai (itself comprising Biên Hòa and Long Khánh); Bà Rịa–Vũng Tàu (itself comprising Vũng Tàu, Bà Rịa, and Phú Mỹ); Tây Ninh (Tây Ninh); Long An (itself comprising Tân An and Kiến Tường); Bình Phước (itself comprising Đồng Xoài, Bình Long and Phước Long); Tiền Giang (itself comprising Mỹ Tho, Cai Lậy and Gò Công)
Hanoi Metropolitan Region: comprising Hà Nội and the former province of Hà Tây (itself comprising Hà Nội's urban districts, Gia Lâm, Đông Anh, Mê Linh, Sóc Sơn, Hà Đông and Sơn Tây); Bắc Ninh (itself comprising Từ Sơn and Bắc Ninh); Thái Nguyên (itself comprising Thái Nguyên, Sông Công and Phổ Yên); Vĩnh Phúc (itself comprising Phúc Yên and Vĩnh Yên); Phú Thọ (itself comprising Phú Thọ and Việt Trì); Hòa Bình (Hòa Bình); Hưng Yên (ítelf comprising Hưng Yên and Mỹ Hào); Hải Dương (itself comprising Chí Linh and Hải Dương); Bắc Giang (Bắc Giang) and Phủ Lý (Hà Nam)

Europe

Belgium

The Flemish Diamond is the Flemish reference to a network of four metropolitan areas in Belgium, three of which are in the central provinces of Flanders, together with the Brussels Capital Region. It consists of four agglomerations which form the four corners of a diamond shape: Brussels, Ghent, Antwerp and Leuven. Over five million people live in this conurbation, with a population density of more than 800 per square kilometre.
Actually, given the high level of commuting from and to Brussels every day, supported by one of the densest networks of railways and motorways in the world, It could be easily argued that the whole Belgium and Luxembourg area is one conurbation or is becoming one.

France
The most notable conurbation is Lille-Roubaix-Tourcoing-Villeneuve-d'Ascq, located in the north of France, with over 1.2 million people living in the area. That conurbation is actually an international one as Belgian cities such as Tournai are increasingly playing the role of commuter town for Lille.

Germany

Germany has three conurbations along the River Rhine, namely Rhine-Main, Rhine-Neckar and Rhine-Ruhr. The Rhine-Ruhr is the largest conurbation in continental Europe and is a densely populated polycentric metropolitan region in the western part of Germany, comprising the three subregions of Ruhr Metropolitan Region, Düsseldorf-Mönchengladbach-Wuppertal Region and Cologne/Bonn Metropolitan Region. These three are all interlinked by a continuous urban settlement, while at the same time having cultural and economic differences.

Italy
Naples metropolitan area, that includes the whole metropolitan city of Naples, Caserta, Salerno and several other municipalities.

Malta
Valletta Urban Area, the area around the Grand Harbour, is the main conurbation in Malta. It contains 27 of the Malta's 68 local councils including the capital Valletta. According to the Demographia, Valletta Urban Area has a population of 300,000, while the European Spatial Planning Observation Network states that the functional urban area of Valletta has a population of 355,000, which represents about 75% of Malta's population.

Netherlands
The Randstad is a densely populated area in the Netherlands with over 7 million inhabitants. It consists of a cluster of the four most populous cities of the country (Amsterdam, Rotterdam, The Hague and Utrecht) as well as several smaller cities, towns and urbanized villages

Poland

Katowice Urban Area (aglomeracja katowicka''', konurbacja górnośląska, GOP) is the largest conurbation in Poland, located in Upper Silesia, southern Poland. Around 5,294,000 people live in the region — up 5.26% of the population of Poland.

Spain
The conurbation of Barcelona
The conurbation of Bilbao

United Kingdom

Industrial and housing growth in the United Kingdom during the 19th and early 20th centuries produced many conurbations. Greater London is by far the largest urban area and is usually counted as a conurbation in statistical terms, but differs from the others in the degree to which it is focused on a single central area. In the mid-1950s the Green Belt was introduced to stem the further urbanisation of the countryside in South East England.

The list below shows the most populous urban areas in the UK as defined by the Office for National Statistics (ONS). Different organisations define conurbations in the UK differently for example, the Liverpool–Manchester or the Manchester–Liverpool conurbation is defined as one conurbation by AESOP in a comparison report published by the University of Manchester in 2005 found here. The Liverpool–Manchester Conurbation has a population of 5.68 million.

 See also 

 Ecumenopolis
 Ekistics
 Megalopolis
 Transborder agglomeration
 Urban sprawl

 References 
 

 Further reading 
 Patrick Geddes – "Cities In Evolution" Edward Soja – "Postmetropolis"''

Urban studies and planning terminology
Urbanization
Types of populated places